An elephant in Cairo is a term used in computer programming to describe a piece of data that matches the search criteria purposefully inserted at the end of a search space, in order to make sure the search algorithm terminates; it is a humorous example of a sentinel value. The term derives from a humorous essay circulated on the Internet that was published in Byte magazine on September 1989, describing how various professions would go about hunting elephants.

Algorithm
When hunting elephants, the article describes programmers as following this algorithm:
 Go to Africa.
 Start at the Cape of Good Hope.
 Work northward in an orderly manner, traversing the continent alternately east and west,
 During each traverse pass:
 Catch each animal seen.
 Compare each animal caught to a known elephant.
 Stop when a match is detected.

This algorithm has a bug, namely a bounds checking error: if no elephants are found, the programmer will continue northwards and end up in the Mediterranean sea, causing abnormal termination by drowning.

Thus experienced programmers modify the above algorithm by placing a known elephant in Cairo to ensure that the algorithm will terminate. The modified algorithm is therefore as follows:

 Go to Africa.
 Put an elephant in Cairo.
 Start at the Cape of Good Hope.
 Work northward in an orderly manner, traversing the continent alternately east and west,
 During each traverse pass:
 Catch each animal seen.
 Compare each animal caught to a known elephant.
 Stop when a match is detected.
 If you are in Cairo, then there are no elephants in Africa (other than the one you placed there).

See also
Elephant test

Notes

References

External links
List of the other elephant hunting techniques (PDF)

Computer humor
Metaphors referring to elephants